S'More is a dating app developed by Something More Inc. It is considered to be an anti-superficial dating app. Profile photos are revealed over time only after a person has indicated interested in a person via interacting with their profile.

Formation
In 2019, S’More was launched by entrepreneur Adam Cohen-Aslatei, the former managing director of Chappy, Bumble's gay dating app. The company headquartered in New York City. A beta version of S’More was launched in Boston in January 2020. The app is currently available for iOS users only.

S’More has raised two rounds of capital totaling $3.2 million across two rounds. They raised $1.1 million in a pre-seed funding round led by Benson Oak Ventures. Several venture investors including Dmitry Volkov, SideCar Angels, Joshua Black (Principal, Apollo Global Management) participated in the round. They subsequently raised a $2.1 million in a seed funding round led by Benson Oak Ventures. Several venture investors including Mark Pincus and Gaingels, among others participated in the round.

Features
S’More uses a matching algorithm to recommend five potential matches to a user every day. Notably, S’More uses facial recognition technology to prevent catfishing and underage use. According to cnet.com, "S'More blurs out profile photos, forcing daters to focus first on the interests and attributes listed, which lead to more meaningful interactions among daters". American fashion publisher V magazine reported that, the S'More app algorithm, encourages the development of deep relationships amid pandemic.

In April 2020, S’More partnered with HopeLine to raise money to fight the mental health crisis of COVID-19. For each new chat started on the platform, S’More donates $1 to HopeLine.

References

External links 
 

2019 establishments in New York City
Companies based in New York City
Online dating services of the United States